Goa Song is currently President of South China University of Technology, China and a professor in Chemistry.

Early life
Born in Anhui Province in 1964, Gao studied Chemistry at Peking University, China and received his bachelor, master, and Ph.D. degrees in 1985, 1988, and 1991 respectively.

Career
After his Ph.D., Gao became a lecturer (1990-1992), associate professor (1992-1999),  and professor (since 1999) 
at Peking University. In 1992, Gao went to Germany to become a visitor of Aachen University of Technology, Institute of Inorganic Chemistry. In 1998-1999, he went to University of Hong Kong as a visiting scholar. He became Dean of the 
Department of Chemistry at Peking University in 2006. From 2013-2017, he was a Vice President at Peking University. 
In 2018, he was appointed President of South China University of Technology.

Research
Gao has undertaken research on inorganic chemistry and molecular magnetism. He has published over 300 papers in these topics.

Awards
In 2007, Gao was elected a member of Chinese Academy of Sciences and a fellow of the Royal Society of Chemistry, UK.

References

1964 births
Living people
Peking University alumni
Chinese chemists
Members of the Chinese Academy of Sciences